Vushtrri or Vučitrn is a city and municipality located in the Mitrovica District in northern Kosovo. According to the 2011 census, the town of Vushtrri has 26,964 inhabitants, while the municipality has 69,870 inhabitants. Vushtrri is surrounded by the city of Mitrovica to the north, Podujevo in the east, Obiliq in the south, Drenas in the south-west, and Skënderaj in the west. The municipality of Vushtrri has 67 villages.

In antiquity, Vushtrri may have been known as Viciana. When the Roman Empire invaded Dardania in the 1st century BC, the Romans added the Latin suffix 'um' to the name of Viciana, therefore becoming Vicianum. In Albanian, Vushtrri is the name of the plant Ononis spinosa, which is abundant in the region.

The main characteristic of the city is its cultural and historic monuments. The city's castle, stone bridge, public bath and česme (fountain) were built centuries ago and are the biggest attractions of the city.

The area accounts for approximately 3.2% of the total territory of Kosovo.

History 

The Dardani tribe ruled the region in the Iron Age, until the Roman conquest in the 1st century AD. Archaeological sites exist at various places in the vicinity, including Samodrezha, Pestova, Duboc Fortress, Stroc Castle and Breglumi. The region then came under Byzantine rule and later in 1389, under Ottoman rule.

In 1487, Albanian toponyms, such as Shalc, Kuçiq and Guri i Kuq are mentioned in the Nahija of Vushtrri.

During the 1999 Kosovo Independence war, Vushtrri suffered greatly in loss of human life (see Vushtrri massacre) and arson and razing of historical buildings by the Serbian paramilitary forces. The destroyed monuments range from old Ottoman style houses to many historical Ottoman mosques, such as Gazi Ali Beg Mosque (1410).

Geography 

Vushtrri is located in the north-east of Kosovo. Vushtrri is surrounded by Mitrovica in the north, Podujeva in the east, Obiliq in the south, Drenas in the south-west, and Ferizaj in the west. The municipality of Vushtrri has 67 villages. The valley territories surround the Sitnica river, which runs from north to south, reaching its maximum width before it merges with the Lab river. The hilliest part of the municipality is mostly in the east and west sides. The mountains in Vushtrri are in the south part of Kopaonik and the east side of Kukavica. These mountains are a natural border between two big valleys, known as Rrafshi i Kosovës and Fushëgropa e Drenicës.

The biggest river flowing into Vushtrri is the Sitnica. It is the second biggest natural basin river of Kosovo, after the Drin. Eight percent of households in Vushtrri (compared to Kosovo's average of 9%) do not have access to safe drinking water as they get it from tube wells or boreholes.

Vushtrri is rich in natural resources, especially minerals, wood and stone.

Climate 

Because of its geographical position, Kosovo has both a Mediterranean-Continental climate and European-Continental climate. Vushtrri has cold winters and hot summers. The city doesn't have a climate station with full data and observations of meteorological conditions, so the main information comes from the nearest stations in Mitrovica and Pristina. 
Vushtrri has approximately 2,140 hours of sun during the year.

The highest average temperatures are in the months of July and August (20˚C), while the lowest temperatures are in January (-1˚C). The annual average temperature is about 10.1˚C. The annual average rate of air humidity is 77.2%.  Average annual precipitation is about 646 mm.

Demography 

In his 1662 work, Ottoman traveller Evliya Çelebi noted that the residents of Vushtrri were "Rumelians" of which "most of them do not speak Bosnian (Serbo-Croatian) but do speak Albanian and Turkish."

The municipality of Vushtrri has 67 villages. The total number of residents of the municipality is 69,870. Approximately 25,000 people live in urban areas, while 45,000 live in rural areas. The density of population is 202 people/km2.
According to the Kosovo Agency of Statistics, the number of children born in Vushtrri after 2005, is 6504 babies.
Vushtrri has a young population, a high level of birthrate, and local, regional and external migration.

Ethnic groups
The ethnic composition of the municipality:

In Vushtrri there are 11,866 households. 4890 of them are located in urban zones, and 6976 in rural areas. The average number of persons per household is 5.9 people.
According to the statistics, in Vushtrri there are 13,740 buildings. The number of occupied houses is 11,650.

Education 

The first Albanian school in Vushtrri was opened in the fall of 1915. The "Besa Kombetare" Club, led by Hasan Prishtina and Bajram Curri, sent Abdullah Hadri from Gjakova to open the first Albanian school in Vushtrri. In the beginning, the school only taught boys, with more than 260 registered. Thanks to the work of Hasan Prishtina, the school opened its doors for girls education as well. There were 25 girls in the first mixed intake. Emin Efendi Hoti was the first teacher at the school.

The High School of Economics was opened in June 1961 to fulfill the need for financial and accounting professionals. The gymnasium in Vushtrri opened in 1963–1964. In 1983, the city's first kindergarten was established. This institution included children from 1 to 6 years. Its first principal was Feride Hyseni.  Today, the kindergarten has 166 children.

Preschool education is organized in preschool classes (children aged 5–6) within the primary schools, to get the children ready for school. The number of children in preschool education in Vushtrri is 489. There are 47 primary schools (classes from 1 to 5) and secondary schools (classes from 6 to 9) in the municipality of Vushtrri. There are 12,209 students in 548 classes in these schools, with 661 teachers and a total of 852 educational staff. There are 3 high schools in Vushtrri, with 4,223 students and 201 teachers. The total number of students in Vushtrri is 17,087.

In October 2014, the Faculty of Public Safety – part of the Kosovo Academy for Public Safety – was scheduled to start its work, accepting 65 students from all over Kosovo in its first year. The adult residents (aged 18 or older) of Vushtrri have a slightly higher education attainment than Kosovo's average. 5,671 people have no completed education, 9,447 have completed primary education, 18,369 have completed lower secondary education, 20,049 have completed high school, 1,134 have completed vocational education, 2,405 have a university degree, 242 have a postgraduate degree, and 29 people have a doctorate.  Adult women residing in the municipality have a lower education attainment than men, with 5% (compared to 1% of men) having no formal education. In terms of the highest education level attained, 32% of women compared to 15% of men have completed primary education, 47% compared to 67% of men have completed secondary education, and 5% compared to 9% of men have a university degree.

Health 

The largest hospital in Vushtrri is the Sheikh Zayed Hospital, which was reconstructed on the initiative of the United Arab Emirates, who financially helped the improvement of the building and the purchase of new equipment and appliances. The reconstruction started in 2001. This hospital treats patients from Vushtrri and the region.

The hospital provides services in sectors including emergency care, stomatology, vaccination, diagnostics, and pharmacy.
In the municipality of Vushtrri there are also eight other family health centers in the villages and eight health clinics.

Politics 
The mayor of the Vushtrri municipality is Ferit Idrizi, who is part of the Democratic Party of Kosovo (PDK). He was elected in the 2021 local elections for the first consecutive term. The municipality assembly consists of 35 members from nine political parties and an independent member of assembly, and its chairman is Nasuf Aliu. The executive of the municipality consists of 12 departments.

According to the 2014–2016 Medium-term Budgetary Framework, the municipality of Vushtrri has planned a significant increase of its budget in the next three years. Compared to 2013, when the municipality budget was about  million, in 2014 the budget was set at approximately  million. The central government grant was  million, while local revenue was  million.

Thirty-five percent of Vushtrri respondents reported that they had visited the municipal office during the previous 12 months to request a document (such as a birth certificate or a building permit) or a service. A slightly higher proportion than Kosovo's average (84% compared to 82%) reported that their request was fulfilled, whereas 6% reported that they were only sometimes provided with the requested document or service. Higher percentages of Vushtrri residents compared to Kosovo's averages said that the Public Administration was efficient or very efficient in issuing all of the following documents: passports (87%), ID cards (90%), vehicle registration documents (79%), driver's licenses (84%), building permits (73%), business licenses (70%), marriage, birth, and death certificates (87%), and Social Assistance cards (69%).

KMS 2012 data showed that the share of Vushtrri residents who were satisfied with the work of their Mayor, Municipal Assembly, and Municipal Administration was lower than Kosovo's average: 67% of Vushtrri residents compared to 69% of Albanians on average were satisfied with the work of their Mayor; 49% compared to 63% of Albanians with the work of their Municipal Assembly; and 45% compared to 64% of Albanians with the work of the Municipal Administration. A relatively high share (65%) of Vushtrri residents believed that their local authorities had the capacity to solve the problems in their municipality. The share of those who believed that only the central government can solve these problems was equal to Kosovo's average of 15%.

The satisfaction level of Vushtrri residents with local authorities was slightly higher than Kosovo's average. While their satisfaction level was significantly lower for most of the public goods and services, the residents of Vushtrri were more satisfied with public procurement and tenders, protection of cultural heritage, nature and species conservation, management of public spaces (availability and usability of parks and squares, street lighting, and environmental protection), public parking (safety, availability, signage, and location) and sidewalks (availability, usability, and condition) compared to Kosovo's averages.

The residents of Vushtrri were mostly satisfied with access to and quality of education in preschools, primary schools, and secondary schools, emergency services (firefighting and medical emergency services), and Kosovo Police. The lowest satisfaction level was recorded for electricity supply, the supply of medicines and medical supplies in hospitals and family medical centers, and cultural, youth, and sports activities.

Economy 

Vushtrri is a city with sustainable economic development, thanks to good-quality arable land that offers favorable conditions for cultivating many agricultural crops. Vushtrri is the leader in the growing of potatoes in Kosovo.

In Vushtrri there are 2641 registered businesses. Based on official data from the Ministry of Trade and Industry, 45.36% of businesses are engaged in commerce, 19% in transportation and telecommunication, 9% in offering services like hotels and restaurants.

Retail activity is concentrated mainly in the city center, on the roads "Deshmoret e Kombit" and "Skenderbeu", while major markets are scattered on the outskirts of town, on the Vushtrri–Pristina highway. Hotels, bars, and fast food restaurants are mainly concentrated in the center of the city, principally in the "Sheshi i lirise" and "Adem Jashari" streets.

There are also plans to construct an industrial area in a place called Lumadh, in an area of  where  million will be invested along with donors to complete infrastructure for the area, which will help to improve conditions for business activities, especially manufacturing.

The Vushtrri municipal assembly, during its session on March 27, 2008, decided to create an Industrial Zone of common interest in the zones of Banjskë, Tarazhë, Bukosh and Gracë.

 Taraxhë – pasture land, surface area of 04.84.18 ha;
 Bukosh – pasture land, surface area of 17.98.87 ha.
 Gracë – arable land, at the site called "Utrinë", total surface area of 24.48.70 ha.
 Banjskë – surface area of 76, 86.60 ha and the rest total area is 10, 65.88 ha.

The Vushtrri municipal assembly is also in the process of taking a decision to create a business zone in the village of Lumadh. The designated site for the business park is Lumadh-Vushtrri. The project was developed and submitted to the Ministry of Trade and Industry.

The municipality of Vushtrri lies between two regional centers, Pristina and Mitrovica. This enables access to these two big markets. According to the municipality's official data, the number of employed people in specific sectors is:

This data only includes administration employees, while other public institutions, households, hospital, schools, police, prison, etc., are not included. The total number of employed people in Vushtrri is approximately 16,000.

Major employers in Vushtrri include:

 "Vipa Çips" – Potato products;
 "Berto" – Furniture manufacturing;
 "Emona Market" – Shopping center;
 "Bini" – Door and windows manufacturing etc.;
 "Etc" – Shopping center;
 "Agro Vini" – Potato producer/exporter and machinery sales;
 "Standard" – Production of glue and paints etc.;
 "Albed" – Furniture manufacturing;
 "Molitoria" – Flour mill;
 "Llamakos" - Metal sheets manufacturing;
 "Kotex" – Underwear manufacturing;
 "Ariani" – Construction;
 "Zariqi/Dijari" – Construction company;
 "Preteni" – Doors and windows manufacturing.

Agriculture 

One of the main economic activities in Vushtrri is agriculture. The most cultivated crops are potato, wheat, corn, vegetables and forage crops. In recent years orchards with apples, plums, and pears are expanding more and more. Vushtrri is the biggest producer of potatoes in Kosovo. Tradition, high-quality seeds imported from the Netherlands, advanced technology and water system from the Iber-Lepenc company are the main factors that Vushtrri's farmers keep achieving high potato yields, nearly reaching the average European level. The biggest potato cultivation companies are Pestova, Agro Vini and Unikorsum.

Pestova as a private company was established in 1991 and was re-registered in 1999. Since January 2008, the European Bank for Reconstruction and Development (EBRD) has been a co-shareholder in Pestova. Pestova's business activities are: the import, production and sale of seed potato; the same of agricultural machinery; the production and sale of fresh potatoes; potato processing into chips and other products such as fries and other snacks. The European Commission has supported Pestova since 2001. USAID and the Kingdom of the Netherlands have given their support as well since 2003 and 2008 respectively. Farmers of this area are also well known for livestock production including cattle, sheep, poultry and others.

Agribusiness in the city is developed generally by the private sector.

Investments 
Vushtrri continues to be financed mostly by government funding, which will be approximately 87% of the total budget of the municipality in the next three years. The government grant dedicated to municipality of Vushtrri was increased by 21% from 2013 to 2014. It is predicted that this grant will be raised by 3.5% each year, in the coming years.

The municipality's local revenues decreased from 2011 to 2012. The annual decrease rate was 7.18%. According to the development plan, during 2014-2016 it is expected that own source revenues will increase by approximately 3.66%.

Vushtrri finished its so-called emergency phase investment program, starting a new program of investment for development. Past investments during the post-war period have enhanced the quality of life for citizens and built infrastructure necessary for creating a favorable business environment. In the last four years 186,547 meters of roads were asphalted; 77 roads, covering a distance of 21,733 meters, were paved; a sewage network of 40,389 meters and a water network of 86,414 meters were also constructed. Further, 22 bridges were built; 75 school buildings were built or renovated; 29 medical clinics and many other investment projects were implemented. Over the past few years 600 capital investment projects, worth more than €50 million, were implemented.

The municipality has planned significant amounts of money to spend in capital investments in the next years. These investments will take place in building inter-municipal roads, water supply and sanitation infrastructure.  Vushtrri has  of roads, of which nearly 90% are asphalted. Of the 11.866 households, 8846 of them have access to sanitation infrastructure. In the period from 2014 to 2016, building of four new schools was planned, along with the reconstruction of old schools.

Data from 2012 showed that the percentage of households of Vushtrri that could not afford basic goods and services was lower than Kosovo's average. Whereas 20% of all Kosovar residents could not afford a meal with meat once per week, the same was true of 15% of Vushtrri residents; 30% compared to Kosovo's average of 42% could not afford to pay for public utilities; 24% compared to Kosovo's average of 34% were unable to cover the expenses of treating flu or any other minor illness; 37% compared to Kosovo's average of 49% could not afford to buy new clothes and footwear whenever necessary; 67% compared to Kosovo's average of 71% could not afford to go to a restaurant once a month; and 74% compared to Kosovo's average of 76% could not afford to pay for a week's holiday away from home once a year. A similar percentage to Kosovo's average (36% of households) could not afford to invite family or friends for a meal at least once a month.

Similar to the rest of the municipalities in Kosovo, unemployment was considered to be the biggest problem in Vushtrri by 47% of its residents. Poor water supply is ranked the biggest problem by 17% and poor electricity supply by 13%. The proportion of employed adults (aged 18–64) in Vushtrri (29%) was equal to Kosovo's average. While the percentage of unemployed was 22%, the share of those who are outside the labor market (49%) as they were either unemployed and not looking for work (4%),  were studying, disabled, or housewives, or had retired was slightly higher than Kosovo's average of 45%. The majority of adult women residing in Vushtrri (77%) were outside the labor market; the equivalent figure for men was 29%; 11% of women were in employment, compared to 42% of men.

Culture 
Vushtrri is an economic, educational, cultural and sports center. The municipality invested heavily in improving the quality of life of its citizens; there are many municipality-organized activities and entertainment in the city and the surrounding areas.

Cultural heritage 

Vushtrri has several historica monuments. The Nine-Arched Bridge was built in the center of the old city, which remains in the city center. The Old Fortress in Vushtrri was built in the Justinian I period (527-565). It served as an inn during the medieval period as well as the Ottoman Empire. It was the seat of Đurađ Branković in the time while he was district lord of Kosovo.

The Nine-Arched Bridge was built between the late antiquity and early medieval periods. The building of the bridge is traditionally attributed to the Vojinović brothers, to whom is also attributed the nearby Vushtrri Fortress, while its style places it at the end of the 14th or early 15th century. The bridge is located in the north-western part of the old city. It is 135 meters long and six meters wide and has nine arches. However, legends suggest it once had 12 arches, three of which were later covered. The stone bridge was built over the Sitnica River, but the river has since changed its course by several hundred meters to the west.

The Hammam (public bath) was built in the 15th century by Gazi Ali Beu. It is one of the oldest hammams in the Balkans, and was used until the Second World War. It served as a public bath for both men and women, who used the hammam on different days. These monuments are under state protection.

Religion 

The Ottoman invasion in the 14th century converted the Albanian population to Islam. Besides its cultural monuments, Vushtrri has many mosques left as a heritage from the Ottoman times. Nowadays, according to Kosovo Agency of Statistics, the biggest religions in Vushtrri are Islam, Orthodoxy and Catholicism. According to 2011 Census, the numbers of each religion were:
 Muslim 69,359 people
 Orthodox 386 people 
 Catholic 15 people
 Others 100 people

The most ancient mosques are:
 Xhamia e Gazi Ali Beg – built in 1410 near the public bath (Hammam), this mosque is one of the oldest ones in Kosovo. Destroyed during the war, this mosque was rebuilt.
 Xhamia Krasniqi – this was built in 1675 from Krasniqi family and was reconstructed after the war with the help of donors because it was destroyed by the Serbian Army.
 Xhamia e Ҫarshise – built in 1878, in the centre of the city and destroyed by the Serbian Army. After the war, with the assistance of the United Arab Emirates, this mosque was reconstructed. Now it is called Shejh Zahid Mosque.

As well as the mosques, in Vushtrri there is another object from the Islamic tradition called Tyrbe. It is located in the city's park and it is believed that was built nearly 200 years ago. Its shape is octagonal, and in the inside there are 6 tombs of the people who had military functions.

Near the park of the city is the Serbian Orthodox Church of St. Elijah. The church was built in 1834 in the eastern part of the city of Vushtrri where there had previously been an old Serbian medieval church. The Church of Holy Trinity, Velika Reka was destroyed in 1999.

Music 

The traditional recreations of folk music, dances and a significant number of traditional instruments have been conserved. Years ago, in the villages of Vushtrri, different kinds of music were developed, especially ballads and legendary epic songs. Years later, love songs, wedding songs and others started to grow.

During 1915–1918, with the impact of Hasan Prishtina, the "First musical band" and the "First association of culture and art", which also had a section of act, music and reciters, were established. After the World War II, the first association of culture and art was called "Rashid Deda" and later was renamed "Hasan Prishtina". This association was awarded second place in the international event "Kaçaniku 2000". The Hasan Prishtina House of Culture was built in 1970. It had a great importance in the promotion of cultural life in Vushtrri. The House of Culture started its work in traditional orchestra, dancing and entertainment orchestra.

The Archive of History was established on 3 March 1968 and it still continues its work as an independent institution.

Festivals 

There is a wide range of annual activities either organized or supported by the municipality.

These include:
 Gatherings of Albanian Poetesses (24–28 May) – attended by all female poets throughout the Albanian territories.  This event started in 1973. In its first years of activity, it was held in the honor of  International Women Day (8 March). Female students of high schools were the only ones to participate. In 1985 the total number of participants was 53. After the war of Kosovo, this event starts gathering female poets from all over the Albanian territories and diaspora. The most successful female poets during years were: Miradie Ramiqi, Fehime Selimi, Xheraldina Buqinca, Hadije Jakupi, Rrezarta Duraku, Afroviti Gusho and Meri Lalaj. This event takes place during 24–28 of May in the House of Culture, a tradition continuing still, and it is supported by the municipality of Vushtrri.
 Potato Day (1–10 October) is a traditional event held each year in the municipality of Vushtrri, where people from different places participate. Intellectuals, businessmen, government, facilitators from governments of different countries-ambassadors, media and other relevant people take part in this event.
 Regional Fair of Local Products – Local producers participate and have the opportunity to meet each other, cooperate and enhance their markets.
 Honey Day Fair – Organized in cooperation with the Beekeepers' Association "ËMA".
 The Independence March – young people of Vushtrri march through the city, the purpose of which is to remember the sacrifices of Kosovo Albanian people through the years, and to celebrate the Independence Day.
 The Schools' Fair – organized by the municipality, NGOs, and schools, this fair promotes the skills and achievements of the students of all schools of Vushtrri.

Sports 

The most organized and successful sports in Vushtrri are football, handball, basketball, volleyball, ping-pong, chess and judo. The municipality  has given to Kosovo's sports many quality athletes and teams, which have represented Kosovo in international competitions.

Vushtrri's residents are notably strong sports fans, especially the organized group of fans called "Forca". Forca is known in the entire country as one of the most dedicated and committed ultras groups. This group of supporters was established in 1993 and since then they have continuously supported the local sports teams in Vushtrri. This continuous support led to their motto "S'ka mu nal" (Never quit). There are nearly 500 active members of the group, led by Qenan Mulaku. They attend every football, handball and basketball matches.

Football

K.F. Vushtrria was founded in 1922. At that time the Football Federation did not exist so the team had to play friendly matches with other teams. After the end of Second World War, the team became a member of the Football Federation, where it began to play in Kosovar League. The team won the league title for the first time in the 2013–14 season.

The most successful players to come out of this club are Ahmed Januzi who currently plays for Vorskla Poltava in the Ukrainian Premier League, Armend Dallku who plays as a central defender for the same club, and Milot Rashica who plays in the Bundesliga for Werder Bremen.

Handball 
K.H. Vushtrria was established in 1953–1954 by Fahri Buqinca. The biggest success of this club was competing in the Federative Second Division of former Yugoslavia, with Tefik Mikushnica as their coach. The best players of this club were Jeton Tërstena, Agron Shabani, Jakup Gerxhaliu and Fazli Jetullahu. In 1960, the women's handball team was also established.

In 1974 in the village of Samadrexha was formed another male handball team called K.H. Samadrexha.

Both female and male handball teams from Vushtrri participate in European competitions; both also compete in the Super League of Kosovo.

Basketball 
This sport first began in 1955 when Fahri Buqinca brought the first basketball rims and nets. The basketball team Llamkos was established in 1955 by Fetah Rashica, but was only registered as a club in the Kosovo Basketball Federation in 1981. As well as the senior team, there also were junior teams and a basketball school within the club. In 1987 the club reached the final of the Kosovo Super Cup. The most successful basketball player that this club had was Ferit Zekolli who played for different basketball clubs in Kosovo, Croatia and Serbia. Today the basketball male team is in the Second Division of Basketball (Liga e Pare).

Other sports 
 Volleyball was first introduced in 1946, while the first male club was formed in 1952, participating years later successfully in Yugoslavian competitions. Qani Kaleci, Ahmet Cecelia, Raif Dallku, Xhelal Pantina and Haki Mavriqi were the most famous players of the club.
 The Ping Pong club Hasan Prishtina is one of the oldest clubs in the municipality of Vushtrri, which was founded in 1950 by Fahri Buqinca and Sakine Maxhuni. In 1961, Sakine Maxhuni as a representative of Vushtrri took first place and became the Kosovo ping pong champion. She was the first person to win a championship title at the national level in any sport in Vushtrri. Xhemajl Cecelia contributed as an active player from 1960 and later became the coach of this club. In women competitions, Xhevahire Asllani was twice a competitor in Kosovo's ping pong championship.
 Chess was one of the most popular sports in Vushtrri. Ramadan Ajvazi, Muje Ferati, Hysen Hyseni, Blerim Zabërgja and Ragip Mikushnica were the first known chess masters in Vushtrri, also representing Kosovo in international chess competitions.

Venues 
 "Ferki Aliu" Stadium is a football venue located in the southern part of the city. It is currently used for football matches and is the home ground of K.F. Kosova Vushtrri of the Kosovo Football Super League. Its capacity is approximately 5000 seats. Its infrastructure will be improved after announced investments by Ministry of Culture, Youth and Sport of Kosovo.
 "Stadiumi i Gumës", built in concrete, was used long before a sports hall was built. Positioned near the park of the city, this stadium was first used for handball matches and later for futsal competitions.

Notable people 

 Mara Branković (1401-1487), Serbian princess and first Valide sultan (Queen mother) of the Ottoman empire as the adoptive mother of Sultan Mehmed II.
 Kantakuzina Katarina Branković (1418–19 - 1492)
 Gligorije Elezović (1879-1960), Serbian historian
 Salih Bey Vuçitërni (1880-1949), Albanian politician and religious administrator
 Snežana Mišković, (born 1958), Serbian rock artist who represented Yugoslavia in the Eurovision Song Contest 1982 as part of Aska
 Jorgovanka Tabaković (born 1960), Governor of the National Bank of Serbia
 Hasan Prishtina (1873–1933), Albanian politician, Prime Minister and nationalist
 Azem Galica (1889–1924) and Shote Galica (1895–1927), Albanian rebels
 Adem Mikullovci (b. 1939), Albanian actor
 Rahim Ademi, Croatian army general
 Ahmet Shala (b. 1961), Kosovan former minister and current ambassador
 Isa Sadriu (1963), footballer and coach
 Armend Dallku, footballer
 Ahmed Januzi, footballer
 Samir Ujkani, footballer
 Shefki Kuqi, footballer
 Njazi Kuqi, footballer
 Mirjeta Shala, Miss Universe Kosovo 2013

See also 
 Viciano
 Sanjak of Viçitrina
 List of monuments in Vushtrri

Notes

References

Bibliography
 Vushtrria - Viciana me rrethine, Vushtrri 2003
 Noel Malcolm, KOSOVO A short story, 1998, London
 Fejaz Drancolli, Monumental Heritage in Kosova, 2011, Prishtine

External links 

 
Municipalities of Kosovo
Cities in Kosovo
Populated places in the District of Mitrovica